Ibrahima Sory Bangoura (born 8 December 1982 in Conakry) is a Guinean footballer who plays in Guinea for Hafia FC.

Bangoura was a member of the Guinea squad for the 2006 African Nations Cup, where the team was eliminated in the quarter-finals. His cousin Ismaël Bangoura is also a footballer and a member of the team. His favourite position is second striker although he has played as winger or as an attacking midfielder. He is well known for his pace.

Club career
On 25 January 2009 Bangoura signed a five-year-contract with Denizlispor. The transfer fee was estimated to be around €300,000. Ibrahima quickly became a fan favourite, and established himself as a talented goal scorer. Bangoura's other notable feature is his goal celebration, which he performs with teammate and Senegalese international defender Pape Diakhate, it resembles an African dance.

In 2010, he moved to Konyaspor.

In February 2011 Bangoura signed a two-year contract with Khazar Lankaran. After only three months Bangoura was released by Khazar Lankaran.

After leaving Khazar, Bangoura joined Djoliba AC Malian Première Division. In September 2013 Bangoura joined CP Cacereño,  but left the club in December 2013 having not played for the club.

References

1982 births
Living people
Guinean footballers
Guinea international footballers
Guinean expatriate footballers
Ligue 1 players
Süper Lig players
FC Istres players
ES Troyes AC players
Expatriate footballers in Turkey
Denizlispor footballers
Guinean expatriate sportspeople in Turkey
Khazar Lankaran FK players
Iraklis Thessaloniki F.C. players
2006 Africa Cup of Nations players
2012 Africa Cup of Nations players
Association football fullbacks
Wasquehal Football players